Oumaima Aziz (born 1 March 2001) is an inactive Moroccan tennis player.

Aziz has a career-high ITF juniors ranking of 185, achieved on 26 March 2018.

She made her WTA Tour main-draw debut at the 2018 Rabat Grand Prix in the doubles tournament, partnering Diae El Jardi.

Aziz represents Morocco at the Fed Cup, where she has a win/loss record of 2–1.

ITF Junior Circuit finals

Singles (1–0)

Doubles (6–4)

References

External links
 
 
 

2001 births
Living people
Moroccan female tennis players
21st-century Moroccan women